The Cascade virus (also known as Herbstlaub in Germany) is a prominent computer virus that was a resident written in assembly language, that was widespread in the 1980s and early 1990s. It infected .COM files and had the effect of making text on the screen fall (or cascade) down and form a heap at the bottom of the screen. It was notable for using an encryption algorithm to avoid being detected. However, one could see that infected files had their size increased by 1701 or 1704 bytes. In response, IBM developed its own antivirus software.

The virus has a number of variants. Cascade-17Y4, which is reported to have originated in Yugoslavia, is almost identical to the most common 1704 byte variant. One byte has been changed, probably due to a random "mutation". This, however, has resulted in a "bug" in the virus. Another mutated variant is also known - it infects the same file over and over.

References
F-Secure Computer Virus Information Pages: Cascade

External links
 Video of the Cascade virus in action (YouTube)

DOS file viruses
Hacking in the 1980s